Peroni Brewery is a brewing company, founded by Francesco Peroni in Vigevano, Italy in 1846.  It is probably best known worldwide for its pale lager, Nastro Azzurro (5.1% ABV), which was the 13th best-selling beer in the United Kingdom in 2010.

By 2016, Peroni was owned by Miller Brands U.K. of SABMiller. As part of the agreements made with regulators before Anheuser-Busch InBev was allowed to acquire SABMiller, the company sold Peroni to Asahi Breweries on 13 October 2016.

Foundation and early history

Foundation by Giovanni Peroni & Vigevano 
The Peroni company was established under the founding family name in the town of Vigevano, Italy, in 1846. 
Due to booming business, a second brewery was built in Rome. The company was moved to Rome by Giovanni Peroni in 1864, six years prior to Rome becoming the Italian capital in 1870. Throughout the late 19th and early 20th centuries, the company became one of the most prominent brewing companies in the newly unified Italian nation.

Advertising 
In the 1960s and through their expansion, Peroni Nastro Azzurro launched numerous successful advertising campaigns, keeping a strong focus upon the sea and sailing world; each campaign featuring a model styled in a sailor outfit and hat.

In February 2021, Aston Martin F1 Team announced a partnership with Peroni to promote the Peroni Libera 0.0% alcohol free beer brand.

Acquisition and expansion 

By the 1990s, both the Peroni brand name and product line were distributed and known worldwide. The London-based brewing giant SABMiller bought the company in 2003, making it one of the few international brands in its portfolio.

Peroni was bought from SABMiller by the Japanese brewing giant Asahi in February 2016.

Brands

Beers under the Peroni brand include: Crystall, a 5.6% abv pale lager; Peroni Gran Riserva, a 6.6% abv strong lager; Peroncino, a 5% pale lager; Peroni Leggera, a 3.5% pale lager. The company also produces the Wührer brand – a 4.7% pale lager launched in Brescia in 1829. The main brands are Peroni and Nastro Azzurro.

Peroni
Peroni is the Peroni company's original brand. According to Assobirra, it is the best selling beer in Italy. It is 4.7% abv and made with barley malt, maize, hop pellets and hop extract. By the 1950s and 1960s, Peroni was the most recognized brand of beer throughout the Italian peninsula and in 2019 was one of the five most popular Italian beers in the world.

Nastro Azzurro
Nastro Azzurro is a 5.1% alcohol by volume pale lager. Launched in 1963, it is the Peroni Brewery's premium lager brand. The name means "Blue Ribbon" in Italian, in honor of the Blue Riband won by Italian ocean liner SS Rex in 1933. Nastro Azzurro has also sponsored teams in Grand Prix motorcycle racing. In 1997 they sponsored a 125cc Aprilia team with rider Valentino Rossi, who won the championship in that season. In 2000 and 2001 they sponsored a 500cc Honda team, again with Rossi as the rider.

References

External links

Birra Peroni website
Peroni Nastro Azzurro Facebook Page
 Peroni Nastro Azzurro International Site
 Nastro Azzurro Homepage
 Fashion designer Antonio Berardi's art direction for Peroni Nastro Azzurro's Russian advertising campaign, JCReport.com
 Emporio Peroni Press Release, 2005

Beer brands of Italy
Breweries in Italy
Asahi Breweries
Food and drink companies based in Rome
Manufacturing companies based in Rome
Manufacturing companies established in 1846
Food and drink companies established in 1846
1846 establishments in Italy